The following is a partial list of types of anaerobic digesters. These processes and systems harness anaerobic digestion for purposes such as treatment of biowaste, animal manure, sewage and biogas generation. Anaerobic digesters can be categorized according to several criteria: by whether the biomass is fixed to a surface ("attached growth") or can mix freely with the reactor liquid ("suspended growth"); by the organic loading rate (the influent mass rate of chemical oxygen demand per unit volume); by centralized plants and decentralized plants. Most anaerobic digesters worldwide are built based on wet-type anaerobic digestion, wherein biomass (usually animal dung) and water are mixed in equal amounts to form a slurry in which the content of total solids (TS) is about 10-15%. While this type is suitable for most regions, it becomes a challenge in large plants where it necessitates the use of large quantities of water every day, often in water-scare areas. Solid-state type digesters, as opposed to the wet-type digesters, reduces the need to dilute the biomass before using it for digestion. solid-state type digesters can handle dry, stackable biomass with a high percentage of solids (up to 40%), and consists of gas-tight chambers called fermenter boxes working in batch-mode that are periodically loaded and unloaded with solid biomass and manure. The widely used UASB reactor, for example, is a suspended-growth high-rate digester, with its biomass clumped into granules that will settle relatively easily and with typical loading rates in the range 5-10 kgCOD/m3/d.

Most common types of anaerobic digestion are liquid, plug-flow and solid-state type digesters.

Examples of anaerobic digesters include:
Anaerobic activated sludge process
Anaerobic clarigester
Anaerobic contact process
Anaerobic expanded-bed reactor
Anaerobic filter
Anaerobic fluidised bed
Anaerobic lagoon
Anaerobic MBRs
Anaerobic migrating blanket reactor 
Batch system anaerobic digester
Continuous stirred-tank reactor (CSTR)
Expanded granular sludge bed digestion (EGSB)
Hybrid reactor
Imhoff tank
Internal circulation reactor (IC)
One-stage anaerobic digester
Plug-flow anaerobic digester
Submerged media anaerobic reactor
Sintex Digester
Solid-state anaerobic digester (SSAD)
Two-stage anaerobic digester
Upflow anaerobic sludge blanket digestion (UASB)
Upflow and down-flow anaerobic attached growth

References